Peter M. Garnavich is the current chair of the Department of Physics at University of Notre Dame. Garnavich joined the Notre Dame in 2000 as an assistant professor, and was promoted to associate professor in 2003. In 2008 he earned the rank of full professor. His primary research area is the study of supernovae and their diversity.

Early life and education 

Garnavich earned a bachelor of science in astronomy from the University of Maryland in 1980, a master of science in physics from Massachusetts Institute of Technology (MIT) in 1983, and a Ph.D. in astronomy from the University of Washington in 1991.

Research and career

He has been a co-author on over 900 papers, a first author on over 200 papers, and has an h-index of 69.

After his time at MIT, he served as a research associate at the Space Telescope Science Institute from 1983–1985. Following completing his Ph.D. he was a postdoctoral fellow at Dominion Astrophysical Observatory from 1992–1995. Garnavich also was a fellow at the Center for Astrophysics  Harvard & Smithsonian from 1995–1999. At Harvard, he was a key member of the High-Z Supernova Search Team that discovered the acceleration of expansion of the universe. That discovery was awarded the 2011 Nobel Prize in Physics as well as the Gruber Prize in Cosmology (2007) and the Breakthrough Prize in Fundamental Physics (2015).

References

Year of birth missing (living people)
Living people
21st-century American astronomers
American cosmologists
University of Notre Dame faculty
University of Maryland, College Park alumni
MIT Department of Physics alumni
University of Washington alumni
Fellows of the American Physical Society